Aage Müller-Nilssen (29 February 1940 – 1 May 2022) was a Norwegian theologian and organizational leader. Having worked as priest in Oslo from 1968, he served as secretary-general for the Church City Mission from 1974 to 1999, and subsequently worked as priest for the organization. 

He was decorated Knight, First Class of the Order of St. Olav in 2005.

References

1940 births
2022 deaths
People from Oslo
Norwegian theologians
Order of Saint Olav